Hồ Ngọc Hà (born 25 November 1984) is a Vietnamese singer, model, and actress.

She started her singing career by releasing her first album titled 24/7 back in 2004. The album was a hit which helped her to make an appearance in Asia Song Festival in Korea.

As being brand ambassador of Sunsilk, she cooperated with the brand to release new album and later run on tour campaign. Her second album Tìm Lại Giấc Mơ (Finding Dreams) was released in 2010 along with many mini projects which were later released in 2011. At the end of 2011, she released her 6th album named Invincible - Sẽ Mãi Bên Nhau with same title head single.

She won 2 awards among 12 nominations, including Golden Apricot Blossom Award, HTV Award, Green Wave Award, Golden Album, Yan Vpop 20. On 14 April 2012, she won Favorite Female Singer Award with 14.216 votes at HTV Award.

Along her singing career, she also starred in many films and made appearance in TV dramas such as Hoa Cỏ May, the movies 39 Độ Yêu (39 Degree of Love) and Chiến Dịch Trái Tim Bên Phải (Right Heart Campaign). She has been the brand ambassador of Sunplay, Toshiba, Sony Ericsson, Sunsilk and also an ambassador of music channel YanTV.

Early life and career
She was born in An Cuu, Hue City but later moved to Quang Binh Province with her parents. She claims to have some French ancestry from her father's side of the family. Her parents worked in banking. When she was 12 years old, she lived apart from family as she was enrolled in piano major at Military Art and Culture College and lived in dormitory instead. When she was 15 years old as her height was already 1,73m, she decided to pursue modelling and gained a few awards such as: runner-up of Ha Noi Supermodel, first prize winner of Vietnam Supermodel and runner-up of Asia's Model Searching competition. In 2003, after moving to Ho Chi Minh City, she made an appearance as being a singer for the first time at Người Đẹp Hát show. Afterward, songwriter Quoc Bao invited her to take part in one song of his upcoming album. Being highly rated from Người Đẹp Hát show and songwriter Quoc Bao altogether, she decided to pursue singing.

In 2001, she was chosen by director Luu Trong Ninh to portray a character in TV drama Hoa Co May, the drama was aired in Saturday Cinema Show on VTV3 at the time. Her first on-screen debut is Huong - an American-Vietnamese girl with tough personality. At that time, she was studying Piano Major at Military Art and Culture College. During this time, there were many rumors about her regarding love. The most infamous one was Huy MC in mid 2014 which led singer Phuong Thanh slapped Ngoc Ha in the name of her friend who is Thu Phuong. However, later in an interview, Phuong Thanh shared that she only wanted to do that via model Xuan Lan and it never happened. In 2010, they performed the song Đêm Nghe Tiếng Mưa (Listening to Night Rain) together at Song Ca Cùng Thần Tượng (Duet With Idol) show, their relationship is fine as they often compliment each other on many stages.

She made a breakthrough with the album 24 Giờ 7 Ngày (24 hours 7 days). In the first album ever, she already made her first hit as the song 24 Giờ 7 Ngày (24 Hours 7 Days). However, being a model still prevented her from making much success in music industry, but it was a firm foundation to prove her own position.

2001: Career debut 
In 2001, she was chosen by director Luu Trong Ninh to portray a character in TV drama Hoa Co May, the drama was aired in Saturday Cinema Show on VTV3 at the time. Her first on-screen debut is Huong - an American-Vietnamese girl with tough personality. At that time, she was studying Piano Major at Military Art and Culture College. Although her acting career was short-lived, the audience was still impressed by her.

In 2005, after the release of 39 Độ Yêu (39 Degree of Love) and Chiến Dịch Trái Tim Bên Phải (Right-heart Campaign), she temporarily stopped acting to focus on singing instead.

2004: Debut album 24 Hours 7 Days
She came to Hanoi and met musician Huy Tuan in order to discuss the implementation of her first album. The songs in the album were produced by Tuan and were composed by famous songwriters such as Duc Tri, Nguyen Xinh Xo, Hong Kien, Duong Thu, An Hieu and Huy Tuan. In the album, the song with same name as the title gained a lot of success and was performed by her on various music shows. In spite of much investment, this album did not make much resonance for her because the album was not widely advertised and there was no promotional music video, until her nude "art" photos were posted online; then her name was mentioned everywhere. In addition, that was when feelings emerged between her and musician Duc Tri. Tri is a close friend of musician Huy Tuan, so the album used his song  (Today He Comes). After that, Tuan introduced two acquaintances and their feelings at the time were a great concern of the media.

2005: Và Em Đã Yêu and start acting again. 
She signed a record deal with songwriter Duc Tri's Music Faces Records, they then worked together for her second album following Huy Tuan's advice. Her next album title is Và Em Đã Yêu (And I'm In Love), which was released in June 2005 by Music Faces Records and Phuong Nam Films. The album was well made primarily focusing on Ho Ngoc Ha's strong image. There were 5 songs in the album composed by Phuong Uyen, Ho Quang Minh and Duc Tri, the 5 other songs were her old songs remixed. Two hit songs of the album were Đêm Nghe Tiếng Mưa (Listening to Night Rain) and Và Em Đã Yêu (And I'm In Love) helped Ho Ngoc Ha become well-known afterward.

After the release of second album, she came back to acting in TV drama version of 39 Độ Yêu (39 Degree of Love) consisting 16 episodes - which used to be a 90 minute in length movie that had been released in several Vietnam box office previously. The drama was not as impressive as expected and was criticised by audiences. VnExpress said the movie was a "messy magic show" with "terrible cut from the original". Later, she joined the movie title Chiến Dịch Trái Tim Bên Phải (Right Heart Campaign) released on 10 June 2005. On the contrary of 39 Độ Yêu (39 Degree of Love), this movie gained plenty of positive reviews from the audiences, Hoai Nam from Tuoi Tre Newspaper wrote a list of "5 reasons that you should watch Right Heart Campaign" along with many compliments from the audience toward her acting. After this movie, she stopped to focus on singing (it was not until 2015, she made a cameo in the movie Hy Sinh Đời Trai by Tan Beo which was released on 21 August 2015)

2006: Muốn Nói Với Anh and Ảo Ảnh
Before running her tour in the US, she and other artists together worked on her third album named Muốn Nói Với Anh (I Wanna Tell You). The album was released on 15 December 2006 by Music Faces Records and Galaxy Studio in Vietnam and later on iTunes in the US on 19 December 2016 by Music Faces Records. Huy Tuan and Duc Tri co wrote the album, while Ho Ngoc Ha also wrote the head single herself and two old songs added from last two albums. There were 3 hit songs in this album including Muốn Nói Với Anh (I Wanna Tell You), Giấc Mơ Chỉ Là Giấc Mơ (Dream Is Only Dream) and Đời Bỗng Vui (Life Is Unexpectedly Happy)

During that time, Ho Ngoc Ha and Duc Tuan released an album named Ảo Ảnh (Illusion) which was a collection of classic songs from famous musicians such as Y Van, Van Phung, Ngo Thuy Mien, Pham Manh Cuong, Do Le, Trong Khuong and Huynh Anh. The album was released in Vietnam by Music Faces Records and in the US on 9 October 2006 by Music Published and Pops Worldwide.

2007-2009: Khi Ta Yêu Nhau, The First Single and Và Em Đã Yêu Tour 
In 2007, she recorded her next album Khi Ta Yêu Nhau (When We're In Love) released by Music Faces Records. However, the album wasn't widely advertised and promoted, thus there was no hit in the album, therefore it was considered as a flop of her career. Also in that year, on Sức Sống Mới Show, host Thanh Mai and Trung Dung carried an interview partially regarding her love and career. However, it was said by a source that she had already broken up with Duc Tri for 1 year already. This created confusion but she officially made the announcement regarding the rumor as: "Right now, I'm being at the peaceful stage of my life. Lots of people are curious of why I look so happy though I've had gone through a break up recently. But it's my real feeling. I love with all of my heart therefore once I break up, I regret nothing". Years after the official break up, she still kept on working and collaborating with Music Faces Records.

In 2009, she was officially back on stage with the album The First Single after a two-year hiatus. This time especially, Duc Tri wasn't a part of the album's production but by many young musicians such as Duong Khac Linh, Hoang Anh and Hung Lan instead. Many copies were sold and received plenty of positive reviews from the audience. Xin Hãy Thứ Tha (My Apology) featuring rapper Suboi is considered one of the best songs of her career. She performed the English version of Xin Hãy Thứ Tha named My Apology at Asia Song Festival in Korea.

According to Korean audience, this is the first time ever Vietnam representative defeated other Asian opponents due to her charming look. She was compared with My Tam and Ho Quynh Huong who joined last years.

At that time, she became brand ambassador of Sunsilk Vietnam. In order to promote Sunsilk and her album, she ran Và Em Đã Yêu Tour across Vietnam starting in September 2009. The ticket was sold by exchanging Sunsilk shampoo containers for ticket in return. The tour started from 27 September 2009 in Ho Chi Minh City to 10 October 2009 in Can Tho, along with many guest artists such as Dam Vinh Hung, Dan Truong, Phan Dinh Tung, Quang Vinh, Pham Anh Khoa, Cao Thai Son, Lam Truong and Nguyen Vu. Và Em Đã Yêu show was live on HTV7 and Sunsilk's official website.

2010-early 2011: Having baby and come back 
In mid 2010, it was rumored that Ho Ngoc Ha was being pregnant with businessman Nguyen Quoc Cuong. She admitted to be pregnant shortly afterward, regarding the father's identity of the baby which she avoided mentioning on the news, however she hoped Cuong would be a responsible father and husband for her and her baby. Many sources said that Ho Ngoc Ha dated Cuong for money and fortune since Cuong is widely known as the son of the successful businesswoman Nguyen Thi Nhu Loan, one of the richest businesswomen in Vietnam with trillion billion Vietnam Dong worth of property. Following this incident, it was revealed that she used to get married at the age of 16.

After giving birth, she came back with her new album titled Tìm Lại Giấc Mơ (Finding Dreams) in 2010. She recorded the album while being pregnant and the release was made right after giving birth. This was the first album without Duc Tri's anticipation and also the last album released by Music Faces Records, Duc Tri openly supported her departure and shared his thought accordingly as: "It's totally normal when she leaves. Personally, the most important thing is what remains between those who stay and those who leave". The album was released in Vietnam on 10 July 2011 and on 21 July 2011 in the US on iTunes. The album included songs written by songwriters Nguyen Hong Thuan, Quoc An, Hoang Anh, Duong Khac Linh and Hoang Huy Long. Especially, Thêm Một Lần Vỡ Tan (One More Break Up) was composed and written by Ho Ngoc Ha herself. However, the song resembled Kylie Minogue's Red Blooded Woman. Speaking of this incident, she said that two songs were completely different, thus she wasn't responsible for the final production and remix whatsoever.

In the promotion for the new album, she continuously cooperated with Sunsilk to hold a small show  in 2010, with same guest artists like the previous show but this time, V-Music band and Ha Anh Tuan were newly added.

Ho Ngoc Ha and V-Music band partnered up for their album Ngày Hạnh Phúc (Happy Day) released in August 2010 in Vietnam; 2 August on iTunes. This was her second duet album and the first song without the production of Duc Tri and Music Faces Records, the third time collaboration with Viet Tan Studio. Nikkon was the sponsor of this album.

2011: Invincible 
Until mid 2011, she released two new singles Sao Ta Lặng Im (Why We Keep Silence) (written and composed by Nguyen Hong Thuan) and Nỗi Nhớ Đầy Vơi (Nonstop Missing) (featuring Noo Phuoc Thinh) which both made remarkable moves on various music charts. Shortly afterward, the ballad single Một Lần Cuối Thôi (Last Time) was released as an opening for her sixth album Invincible - Sẽ Mãi Bên Nhau (Forever Together) which was scheduled to be released at the end of 2011. This album was the collaboration between her, Duong Khac Linh and Thanh Bui significantly working on R&B, album's master was done in Studio Syd (Australia) by Lenon Zervos (this studio has previously worked with Lady Gaga, Kanye West, U2...). The head single Invincible was filmed in Hollywood Studio, USA which was her most invested music video of all times, the plot of the music video was generated by Ha herself in which she portrayed an alien coming back to Earth in order to rescue her lover from the enemy. Danny Do directed the music video but a lot said that this video resembled Katy Perry's ET. The second single Từ Ngày Anh Đi (The Day You Went Away) (composed by Nguyen Hoang Duy) was exclusively aired on YanTV. The director was the award-winning Tran Dinh Hien, in this video she portrayed Egyptian Queen Cleopatra, this is a unique portrayal and also the first time show up in Vietnamese music industry.

Her 2011 live concert occurred on 15 December at Lan Anh Club - Ho Chi Minh City. This was the biggest live show of her eight-year career and directed by Viet Tu. The budget was officially announced as 5 billion Vietnam Dong. In the live show, she performed many of her songs and at the same time satisfied the audience with her well prepared performances. 25 songs were included in the live show which impressed the audience greatly.

The live show was nominated at Devotion Award 2011 in April 2012.

2012: The Voice's Coach and The Second Single
Following multiple successes throughout the years, Ho Ngoc Ha and V.Music band released a new project I Love You. I Love You is the collection of 8 songs about love composed by: Nguyen Hong Thuan, Quoc An, Phuc Bo, Phuong Uyen and Kien Tran.

Vietnam was the second country that was allowed to air The Voice after Korea. The judge included Dam Vinh Hung, Ho Ngoc Ha, Thu Minh and Tran Lap. In order to become one of the judges, she had spent much time and effort, also had a small vocal cord surgery.

In 2012, she won Favorite Female Singer award at HTV Award.

She is also the judge of Centaur Dance Showdown - an international dance competition. She was invited to the show where Vietnam team competed with other teams from different countries, along with Singaporean hip hop dancer Sheikh Haikel and famous Japanese breakdancer Katsuyuki Ishikawa.

In September 2012, while being a judge of The Voice Vietnam, she surprisingly released a new single Đắn Đo (Wondering) including two songs Đắn Đo (Wondering) (composed by Phuong Uyen) and Chôn Giấu Một Tình Yêu (Hidden Love) (featuring Le Quyen) composed by Luong Bang Quang. Beside, Runaway was also attached in the single which is the English version of the song Mãi Mãi Về Sau.

She shared her thought about this single as: "Life is colorful and youth is dreamy, however when you grow up, simplicity is the most important thing in life. With this single, I want to present that simplicity with foremost depth within. From music video to CD design, which should be touching towards everyone. Hopefully the audience will have chance to discover themselves, get to know new things, who knows if they could find themselves in my songs. Don't walk in the same path of emotions and music genres".

Đắn Đo (Wondering) was chosen to be head single. Before the release, Ha and her team kept revealing sneak peek of the song which made it appear on top search. However, the audience was somewhat disappointed once it was officially released due to its unique rhythm and lyrics. Ha herself claimed that Đắn Đo (Wondering) is not a catchy song and it needs time. She shared: "Lots of people wonder why I've chosen difficult paths this time, instead of the same old style; personally thinking, being safe in music is boring".

2013: Got To Dance judge 
Ho Ngoc Ha had a catwalk with supermodel Thanh Hang in an enormous dress inspired by poisonous mushroom designed by Cong Tri, in 11th Đẹp Fashion Show. She was a judge of Got To Dance along with dander Alfredo Torres, Vietnamese-American hip hop dancer Dumbo and dance choreographer Tran Ly Ly. She was the face of Samsung and many other commercials.

On 5 August 2013, at Asian Music Stars Show held by China's CCTV with the participation of many singers from 10 countries and regions, she performed live two songs Runaway (Mãi Mãi Về Sau) and Hãy Thứ Tha Cho Em (Please Forgive Me).

On 12 August 2013, Hãy Thứ Tha Cho Em (composed by Duong Khac Linh, written by Hoang Huy Long) and Giấu Anh Vào Nỗi Nhớ  (Keep You In My Thought) (Chau Dang Khoa) were released in two different music styles. Her unique voice was concentrated with nice dance choreography and her perfect figure. There were three music videos in three different styles for this song, which had hardly happened in Vietnam music industry. In the making of these versions, she and 50 people crew kept working in 4 days at several studios in District 2 & 9 (Ho Chi Minh City) for 15 different sets, 12 uniquely designed costumes and 1 month for post production. At 16th Green Waves Award, she won "Single of the Year" Award for Hãy Thứ Tha Cho Em and Top 10 Favorite Singers.

2014: X Factor and Ho Ngoc Ha Live Concert 2014
On 12 May 2014, she released the album Mối Tình Xưa (Old Love) which was inspired by classic genre from 10 years ago. The album included 11 songs composed by Duc Tri, Nguyen Hong Thuan, Chau Dang Khoa, Pham Toan Thang,...with classic love song vibe. "It could be said that I use these 11 songs to tell a story about my 10 year including career, love and failure" - she shared.

She got a deal to be a judge of X Factor's first season in Vietnam. Despite poor rating, she still contributed her best and became the most favorite judge among the jury. She also gave a hand to help Giang Hong Ngoc win the top prize. At the same time, she released the music video for My Baby (composed by Do Hieu).

On 20 November 2014, her Live Concert was held in Gem Center, Saigon. Talking about this liveshow, she revealed to be performing musical play. Her 8 hits were linked together to make a 40 minute long emotional musical story with powerful and beautiful choreography by John Huy Tran and Ngoc Tu. She even decided to invite John-Paul "JP" San Pedro - a famous American dancer and choreographer who used to work with Janet Jackson, Jennifer Lopez, Britney Spears, Christina Aguilera, Miley Cyrus,...to be a part of this liveshow. Live Concert 2014 was the milestone of her 10-year singing career.

2015-2016: Love Songs and The Face Vietnam
After teasing behind-the-scene photos, the producer of the movie Hy Sinh Đời Trai continued to reveal more detail about the movie. Along with Tran Bao Son, director Luu Huynh's new movie was greatly contributed by 30 artists in plenty different fields, including Ly Hung, Phuoc Sang, Binh Minh, Than Thuy Ha, Dinh Y Nhung, Tuyen Map, Andrea Aybar, Cat Phuong,...among the cast, "King of the Box Office" Thai Hoa and "Queen of Entertainment" Ho Ngoc Ha were announced to be participating in the movie. She originally debuted as a model-actress and become well known by TV drama Hoa Co May and the movie 39 Độ Yêu (39 Degrees of Love) in 2000s. After switching to singing, she had never come back to acting. In Hy Sinh Đời Trai, her role was a cameo.

At the end of April 2016, she officially became one of three coaches of The Face Vietnam with Miss Universe Vietnam Pham Huong and Miss Ao Dai Lan Khue. Her team member Phi Phuong Anh won the first prize.

After releasing two singles Destiny and What Is Love? with Tội Lỗi (Guilty). In May 2016, after a big tabloids targeting at her personal life, she held Love Songs concert in Ho Chi Minh City, which marked her first ever appearance after big scandal of being a "third wheel". Several months later, Love Songs concert was held in Da Nang and Ha Noi; Houston, San Diego, San Jose, Denver, Dallas, Atlanta (America) and Australia, with another 4 concerts in Europe. Later, Love Song - Cả Một Trời Thương Nhớ concert was held on 22 August 2017 at Gem Center.

2017-present 
She has dated actor Kim Ly ever since, after tabloids about her divorce with ex-husband Nguyen Quoc Cuong, being a third wheel with businessman Chu Dang Khoa and the rivalry with singer-actress Minh Hang in The Face Vietnam. In 2018, she released her cosmetic line named M.O.I.

Artistic

Style of performance 
In an interview, she said that after seeing Beyonce's performance in Bangkok, Thailand, she began to "learn Beyonce's performing style" and shared that Beyonce is "my favorite artist that I look up to".

Zing Music Award 2012 awarded her "Singer of The Year". Her dance choreography at Asian Song Festival 2009 was so impressive.

Image and Fashion Icon 
Ho Ngoc Ha used to be considered as one of new generation divas and indeed was nominated for Vietnam Diva - 2005 New Generation. However, she withdrew her name from the list herself saying "she hasn't greatly contributed anything".

She was named "Queen of Advertisement" since many brands and companies chose her to be their representative. YanTV Channel had her as their ambassador.

Personal life

On 21 April 2001, at the age of 16, she was married to the son of a wealthy real estate family in Ha Noi. After meeting the son, "H", she claimed she was pregnant.  This led to a rushed wedding and as time went by with no pregnancy, the husband's family forced her to sign a postnuptial agreement.  The marriage was short-lived and the two went their separate ways.  After 10 years, she met another son of a wealthy real estate family, Nguyễn Quốc Cường, more commonly known as "Cường dollar".  On 20 April 2010, Hà confirmed in an interview that she was pregnant. Though she prefers to keep their relationship quiet, she has stated, "I never wanted to talk to the press about Cường. If my lover was not Cường, there would have never been this kind of manhunt. But this is normal curiosity, and nobody knows the truth better than me. I've got a stable career and at the age of 26, I have the right enter a new chapter of my life." The two never married. On 21 June 2010, Hồ Ngọc Hà gave birth to a baby boy, named Nguyễn Quốc Hưng, via caesarean section. On Lunar New Year 2012, she and Cường had to pay a fine for not wearing helmets.

In 2015, during her relationship with Nguyen Quoc Cuong, she was rumored to be dating a married businessman, Chu Dang Khoa. As a result, everyone began to boycott her and her relationship with Nguyen Quoc Cuong ended.
In 2017, she officially dated Kim Lý, a male model, after the break up with Chu Đăng Khoa. In 2020, she married Kim Lý.  On November 4, 2020, they welcomed twins, Leon and Lisa.

Charity activity 
She is well known to be one who always takes part in many charity activities. She donated money for 20 families living under unfortunate condition in Hoa Hiep Nam Ward, which was up to 50 million VND in total. In October 2009, she released a booklet named Những Khoảnh Khắc Của Hồ Ngọc Hà (Ho Ngoc Ha's Moments), until February next year, all the booklets were sold for 30 million VND. Especially in 2009, while being a guest at the auction Tết Làm Điều Hay (Doing Great Things In Tet), she auctioned the 72 year old golden apricot blossom named "Long Dáng Nghinh Xuân", however she didn't win. On her official website, she and her fanclub later donated 30 million VND from the sale of previous booklet release. In early 2011, she and other singers participated in the show Tổ Ấm Ngày Xuân by Citizen Committee of Ho Chi Minh City and Bureau of Ho Chi Minh City at Tao Đàn Park. At the show, she gave away 200 presents and 400 lucky money envelopes for orphans and children living in unfortunate condition in Ho Chi Minh City. For being wholeheartedly devoted in society and charity activities, she was also rewarded with an honorary from Citizen Committee of Ho Chi Minh City. Later, she and other artists together held the show Ngày Hạnh Phúc (Happy Day) with the consulting from journalist Ngô Bá Lục from vnMedia on 8 March 2011. The organization of Ngày Hạnh Phúc (Happy Day) released an official statement on the website as those who would be able to receive their gifts would be "lottery sellers, cleaning workers, street vendors, casual labors, homeless children, trash collectors,...families that living under the bridges or bus stops. Those won't be certainly confirmed but based on on-site evaluation from the volunteers".

Filmography
 Hoa Cỏ May (2001) - Hương
 39 độ yêu (2005)
 Chiến dịch trái tim bên phải (2005)
 Hi sinh đời trai  (2015)

Television 
 The Voice (2012) - Judge (one season)
 Got To Dance (2013) - Judge (Season 1)
 X Factor (2014) - Judge (Season 1)
 The Remix (2015 - 2016) - Judge (Season 1 - 2)
 Vietnam Super Model (2016) - Judge
 The Face Vietnam (2016) - Mentor (Season 1)
 Your Face Sound Familiar Vietnam (2019-2020) - Judge (Season 7)

Discography

Albums

Studio albums

Collaborative albums

Compilations

Single albums

Singles

As lead artist

2000s

2010s

2020s

As featured artist

Promotional singles

Other charted songs

Performances

Awards

Major awards 

Devotion Music Awards
The award is considered as an "Grammy Award" in Vietnamese music.

Golden Apricot Blossom Awards

Green Wave Music Awards
Green Wave  Music Awards is one of the oldest and most prestigious annual music awards in the Vietnamese music industry. It was started in 1997 with the governing body being the 99.9 MHz FM radio station of the Voice of the People of Ho Chi Minh City.

MTV Europe Music Awards

Other awards

Notes

References

External links

 Official website

1984 births
Living people
21st-century Vietnamese actresses
People from Huế
People from Quảng Bình province
21st-century Vietnamese women singers
Vietnamese film actresses
Vietnamese child actresses